Calochortus indecorus was a species of flowering plant in the lily family known by the common name Sexton Mountain mariposa lily. It was known only from Sexton Mountain in Josephine County, Oregon, in the US. It is now presumed extinct.

This perennial herb had a thick, unbranched stem up to 22 centimeters long. The inflorescence contained up to 6 bell-shaped lavender flowers. The fruit was a winged capsule up to 2 centimeters long.

The plant's habitat was serpentine mountain slopes.

This plant was only collected once and has not been located since. It may have been made extinct by construction on Interstate 5.

References

External links
USDA Plants Profile for Calochortus indecorus

indecorus
Flora of Oregon
Endemic flora of the United States
Extinct flora of North America
Plant extinctions since 1500
Josephine County, Oregon
Endemic flora of Oregon